Andam is a Ghanaian or Filipino surname that may refer to the following people:
Aba Andam (born 1948), Ghanaian physicist
Kenneth Andam (born 1976), Ghanaian sprinter 
Kwesi Akwansah Andam (died 2007), Ghanaian academician 
Zorayda Andam (born c. 1980), Filipino lawyer, beauty queen, television host and news anchor